Albert Square is a fictional location in the British television soap opera EastEnders. It may also refer to:

Albert Square, Manchester, England
Albert Square, an address in Stockwell, London, England
Albert Square, an address in Dundee, Scotland, and home to the offices of D. C. Thomson & Co.
Albert Square, an address near the Lagan Weir in Belfast, Northern Ireland